KRVN may refer to:

 KRVN (AM), a radio station (880 AM) licensed to Lexington, Nebraska, United States
 KRVN-FM, a radio station (93.1 FM) licensed to Lexington, Nebraska, United States